Neon Chrome is a twin-stick shooter video game developed by 10tons.

Gameplay
Neon Chrome is a cyberpunk-themed twin-stick shooter video game played from a top-down perspective. The player takes control of remote controlled human clones and is tasked with eliminating the Overseer to stop their oppressive regime on the dystopic society. The player must ascend to the top floor of the company building where the Overseer is based. The game features procedurally generated levels and destructible environments. The game supports local cooperative play.

Development and release
Neon Chrome was developed and published by 10tons. The game was released for Windows on 28 April 2016, PlayStation 4 on 31 May 2016, Xbox One on 8 June 2016, Linux and macOS on 3 November 2016, and Nintendo Switch on 12 October 2017. In 2017, they released a survival mode called "Arena" as downloadable content.

Reception

Neon Chrome received "mixed or average" reviews on PC and consoles from professional critics according to review aggregator website Metacritic, however the mobile version was more positively received.

References

External links
 

2016 video games
Cooperative video games
IOS games
Linux games
MacOS games
Twin-stick shooters
Multiplayer and single-player video games
Nintendo Switch games
PlayStation 4 games
PlayStation 4 Pro enhanced games
PlayStation Vita games
Video games developed in Finland
Video games using procedural generation
Windows games
Xbox One games
10tons Entertainment games